A Silent Film is the third full-length studio album by British alternative rock band A Silent Film. The album, released on 16 October 2015, was named eponymously and was released under the band's own label, Silent Songs.

Track listing

References

2015 albums
A Silent Film albums